Pitcairnia imbricata is a plant species in the genus Pitcairnia. This species is native to Mexico.

References

imbricata
Flora of Mexico